The Turkmenistan Higher League, also called Türkmenistan Ýokary Liga (Turkmen: Türkmenistanyň Ýokary Ligasy) is the top division of professional football in Turkmenistan,  operated under the auspices of the Turkmenistan Football Federation.

It was founded in 1992. Nine clubs participate in the Higher League of the Turkmenistan National Championship. The season runs between April and November.

Current teams

A total of 8 teams will contest the league.

Soviet era champions
 

1937–38: Lokomotiw Aşgabat
1938: Dinamo Aşgabat
1939–45: no championship
1946: Dinamo Aşgabat
1947: Spartak Aşgabat
1948: Dinamo Aşgabat
1949: Lokomotiw Aşgabat
1950: Spartak Aşgabat
1951: DOSA Aşgabat
1952: DOSA Aşgabat
1953: Dinamo Aşgabat
1954: Combined team of Mary Oblast
1955: Combined team of Aşgabat
1956: Gyzyl Metallist Aşgabat
1957: Combined team of Aşgabat Oblast
1958: Combined team of Aşgabat
1959: Combined team of Nebitdag
1960: Combined team of Çärjew
1961: Energetik Nebitdag
1962: Energetik Nebitdag
1963: Gurluşykçy Mary
1964: Serhetçi Aşgabat
1965: Serhetçi Aşgabat
1966: Serhetçi Aşgabat
1967: Serhetçi Aşgabat
1968: Serhetçi Aşgabat
1969: Serhetçi Aşgabat
1970: Garagum Mary
1971: Maýak Çärjew
1972: Energogurluşykçy Mary
1973: Sementçi Büzmeýin
1974: Awtomobilist Aşgabat
1975: Nebitçi Krasnowodsk
1976: Energetik Mary
1977: Şatlyk Mary
1978: Nebitçi Krasnowodsk
1979: Nebitçi Krasnowodsk
1980: Nebitçi Krasnowodsk
1981: Gurluşykçy Nebitdag
1982: Lokomotiw Aşgabat
1983: Obahojalyktehnika Çärjew
1984: Nebitçi Krasnowodsk
1985: Lokomotiw Aşgabat
1986: Nebitçi Krasnowodsk
1987: SKIF Aşgabat
1988: Ahal Aşgabat Raýon
1989: Medik Nebitdag
1990: Awtomobilist Aşgabat
1991: Sel'khoztekhnika Aşgabat

Seasons summary

Performance by club

League participation 
Note: The tallies below include up to the 2022 season. Teams denoted in bold are current participants.

 30 seasons: Merw, Nebitçi
 28 seasons: Şagadam
 23 seasons: Turan
 22 seasons: Ahal, Köpetdag Aşgabat
 17 seasons: Aşgabat, Bagtyyarlyk-Lebap
 15 seasons: Altyn Asyr
 13 seasons: Ýedigen
 12 seasons: Nisa Aşgabat
 8 seasons: Energetik Mary
 7 seasons: Talyp Sporty
 6 seasons: Büzmeýin
 3 seasons: Dagdan Aşgabat, Galkan Aşgabat, Gazçy Gazojak
 2 seasons: Asudalyk Aşgabat, Balkan Nebitdag, Gara Altyn, Kolhozçy Türkmengala, TSHT Aşgabat
 1 season: Arkaç Gyzylarbat, Babadayhan Babadayhansky Etrap, Bereket Tejen, Hazyna, Hlopkovik Çärjew, Jeýhun Seýdi, Pakhtachi Çärjew, SMM+ Karatamak, Umyt Baýramaly

References

External links
Current Yokary Liga table and results at Soccerway
Yokary Liga at fifa.com

1
Turk
 
Sports leagues established in 1992
1992 establishments in Turkmenistan